LY-88329 is an opioid receptor ligand related to medicines such as pethidine. It has high affinity to the μ-opioid receptor, but unlike structurally related drugs such as 3-methylfentanyl and OPPPP, LY-88329 is a potent opioid antagonist. In animal studies it blocks the effects of morphine and has anorectic action.

See also 
 Alvimopan

References 

Mu-opioid receptor antagonists
Phenols
4-Phenylpiperidines